Ledce is a municipality and village in Kladno District in the Central Bohemian Region of the Czech Republic. It has about 500 inhabitants.

Notable people
Stanislav Fischer (born 1936), astrophysicist and politician

References

Villages in Kladno District